Chuck "Charlie" Crisafulli is an author, culture writer and musician. Crisafulli has regularly contributed to Rolling Stone, Grammy Magazine and the Los Angeles Times.

Biography 
Crisafulli was born in Freeport, New York on December 9, 1961. In a podcast interview with Reduced Shakespeare, Chuck revealed that his musical introduction came with playing tambourine in the fourth grade's school band performance of 'Do You Know the Way to San Jose'. He attended Baldwin Senior High School before studying at Northwestern University and majoring in English. From Evanston, he moved to New York City. Here, he worked as an English teacher at Bishop Ford High School.

In the late 1980s, Crisafulli moved to Los Angeles. When he first arrived, Chuck found himself working with makeup master, Rick Baker.\ For a number of years, he made a living on film sets, primarily in the realm of practical effects and puppeteering. Some of the movies he worked on include Batman Returns, The Blob (1988 film) and Gremlins 2: The New Batch.

Journalism 
Still dedicated to a possible career in writing and music, the Long Islander began freelancing at Los Angeles music publications like Musical Connection and BAM. In 1992, Chuck would begin to work for the Los Angeles Times. Prior to Chuck's persistence to see alt-comedy in LA garner more attention, the scene went relatively unnoticed in major print media. During this spell, he covered then obscure comedians: Sarah Silverman, Janeane Garofalo, Patton Oswalt, David Cross and Bob Odenkirk.

Over the years, the writer would go on to publish articles in Rolling Stone, The Hollywood Reporter, Billboard (magazine), Interview (magazine), Hustler, High Times, Option, Request, Newsday and regularly in the Grammy Magazine.

Books  
In the mid-90s, Chuck wrote two books that explored the context behind the songs of The Doors and Nirvana. Moonlight Drive: The Stories Behind Every Doors Song was released in 1995 and Teen Spirit: The Stories Behind Every Nirvana Song came out the following year.

With his wife, Kyra Thompson, Crisafulli co-wrote Go to Hell: A Heated History of the Underworld.

Meeting through mutual friends, Chuck had lunch with Elvis Presley's longtime friend and confidant, Jerry Schilling. Enjoying their conversation, Crisafulli and Schilling decided on the spot to pen a book regaling Jerry's tales of Presley. In an interview on NPR's Fresh Air, Schilling claimed the book shows a different side of Elvis; one who is unshakeably humble, citing instances of the rockstar continuing to play "Sunday football in the park" despite his celebrity growing by the day. Me and a Guy Named Elvis: My Lifelong Friendship with Elvis Presley was released in 2006.

Chuck co-wrote George Klein 's Elvis: My Best Man. Klein was a well-known deejay in Memphis and spoke candidly of his closeness to Elvis since they were in eighth grade. Klein and Crisafulli remained close until Klein's death in 2019.

Running with the Champ: My Forty-Year Friendship with Muhammad Ali was released in May 2016. The book saw Ali, through the personal lens of friend, Tim Shanahan.

In 2017, Crisafulli co-wrote Getting to "Yes And": The Art of Business Improv with former Second City faculty member and Baby Wants Candy co-founder, Bob Kulhan. Based on Kulhan's longtime teachings, the book delves into improv's positive application to corporate environments and improving business relationships.

Critical Reception to Crisafulli's Writing 
Michiko Kakutani of The New York Times wrote that Shanahan and Crisafulli's Running with the Champ, "Has its share of touching moments... give(s) glimpses of Ali's dignified, decades-long struggle with Parkinson's".

Music 
Chuck Crisafulli is an accomplished multi-instrumentalist. Over the years, he has performed in a variety of groups, including: Moris Tepper, Dogbowl, Shovelhead Bigtop, Filthmobile, Knob & Nozzle, The Blahs, Lisa Parade, The Mobile Homeboys and The Huge Bastards. In his sophomore year at college, the young Crisafulli met Nash Kato and became the bassist in the original lineup of Urge Overkill. Chuck currently plays the drums in the Santa Barbara-based band, The Doublewide Kings.

Since 2018, Crisafulli has released music online under the alter-ego, Charlie Christmas. Produced from his home garage and sometimes bathroom, the music of Charlie Christmas is a self-described "offering of avant-pop songs, nerd-punk anthems, indie-garage screeds and soft-core instrumentals".

In December 2018, Charlie Christmas released the debut album, Weird Old Man. Prof. Elliott Lanam mastered the record from Hidden City Studios. With a promotional push, Weird Old Man played on hundreds of college radio stations.

All instruments on the Charlie Christmas recordings are performed by Crisafulli. However, Spotty Coverage saw his son, Young Jimmy Christmas, enter the garage and collaborate with prominent keys and vocals. The EP consists of five tracks, covering artists from Hank Williams to Bachman–Turner Overdrive.

In the legendary New York venue, CBGBs, Crisafulli's signature can be seen on the green room wall, directly next to that of the Ramones.

Critical Reception to Crisafulli's Music 
Weird Old Man picked up a small cult following, with music blog, StereoStickman calling it "a must" for the year, praising the musician's "Bowie-like aura, classic rock and roll with experimental twangs of creative freedom". Meanwhile, Dan MacIntosh of Skopemag labelled the work, "Inventive, intelligent rock & roll".

Reviewing the Spotty Coverage EP, music bloggers gushed that the recordings left you feeling "euphoric" thanks to its "enthralling organic sound".

Personal life 
Chuck is married to filmmaker and television producer, Kyra Thompson. In 1982, Crisafulli met Thompson at Northwestern University. They have been married since 1992. The couple live in Los Angeles, CA and have two children. He is a lifelong fan of The Beach Boys.

Bibliography 

 Moonlight Drive: The Stories Behind Every Doors Song (1995)
 Teen Spirit: The Stories Behind Every Nirvana Song (1996)
Go to Hell: A Heated History of the Underworld (2005)
 Me and a Guy Named Elvis: My Lifelong Friendship with Elvis Presley (2006)
 Elvis: My Best Man (2011) 
 Running with the Champ: My Forty-Year Friendship with Muhammad Ali (2016)
 Getting to "Yes And": The Art of Business Improv (2017)

Discography

As Charlie Christmas

Albums/EPs 

Weird Old Man by Charlie Christmas (2018)
 Spotty Coverage by Charlie Christmas, Young Jimmy Christmas (2020)

Singles 

 American Dirt (2010) 
Dark Side of the Mood (2016) 
New Year's Day Martini (2018) 
In Dumb We Trust (2018) 
Happy Day (2019) 
 Pandemic Drinking Song (Empty So Fast) (2020)
 You Ain't Seen Nothing Yet (2020)

References 

1961 births
Living people